Samuel John Bottoms (October 17, 1955 – December 16, 2008) was an American actor and producer.

Early life
Bottoms was born in Santa Barbara, California, the third son of James "Bud" Bottoms (a sculptor and art teacher) and Betty (Chapman), both of whom outlived him. He was the brother of actors Timothy Bottoms (born 1951), Joseph Bottoms (born 1954) and Ben Bottoms (born 1960).

Career
When Bottoms was 16 years old, he was on the set of The Last Picture Show, in which his older brother Timothy starred, when the director Peter Bogdanovich decided to give him a screen test. He ended up in the movie as the character of Billy, who has no spoken lines but plays a pivotal role in the drama. Five years later, Bottoms appeared with Clint Eastwood in The Outlaw Josey Wales. 

Bottoms may be best remembered for his role as surfer Lance B. Johnson, a Navy Gunner's Mate stationed on a river boat in Francis Ford Coppola's Apocalypse Now. Bottoms acquired hookworm during the chaotic production in the Philippines, and the parasite "wrecked his liver".

Death
At age 53, Bottoms died of glioblastoma multiforme, a type of brain tumor, on December 16, 2008. He was cremated and his ashes given to his widow.

Filmography

Film 
The Last Picture Show (1971) as Billy
Class of '44 (1973) as Marty
Zandy's Bride (1974) as Mel Allan
The Outlaw Josey Wales (1976) as Jamie
Apocalypse Now (1979) as Lance B. Johnson
Up from the Depths (1979) as Greg Oliver
Bronco Billy (1980) as Leonard James
Gringo mojado (1984) as Murray Lewis Jr. 
Prime Risk (1985) as Bill Yeoman
Hunter's Blood (1986) as David Rand 
Gardens of Stone (1987) as Lt. Webber
After School (1988) as Father Michael McCarren
Hearts of Darkness: A Filmmaker's Apocalypse (1991) as Himself
Dolly Dearest (1991) as Elliot Wade
Ragin' Cajun (1991) as Legs
North of Chiang Mai (1992) as Michael
Sugar Hill (1993) as Oliver Thompson
The Trust (1993) as James Baker
Project Shadowchaser III (1995) as Kody
Snide and Prejudice (1997) as Therapist Schaub
Joseph's Gift (1998) as Robert Keller
The Unsaid (2001) as Joseph Caffey
Shadow Fury (2001) as Mitchell Madsen
Looking Through Lillian (2002) as Gene
True Files (2002) as Alex Lomax
Seabiscuit (2003) as Mr. Blodget
Havoc (2005) as Lt. Maris
Shopgirl (2005) as Dan Buttersfield
Winter Passing (2005) as Brian
SherryBaby (2006) as Bob Swanson Sr.
Finishing the Game (2007) as Martey Kurtainbaum (final film role)

Television 
Doc Elliot (1974) as Gary Basquin
Savages (1974) as Ben Campbell
Lucas Tanner (1974) as Ron Gibbons
Cage Without a Key (1975) as Buddy Goleta
Marcus Welby, M.D. (1976) as Ed
Greatest Heroes of the Bible (1978) as Joseph
The Eddie Capra Mysteries (1978)
East of Eden (1981) as Cal Trask
Desperate Lives (1982) as Ken Baynes
Return to Eden (1983)
No Earthly Reason (1984) as Coley
Island Sons (1987) as Sam Faraday
The Witching of Ben Wagner (1987) as Mr. George 'Dad' Wagner
Murder, She Wrote (1989–1991) as Joe Hellinger / Sgt. Joe Rice
21 Jump Street (1990) as Robert Johnson
Zooman (1995) as Policeman
The X Files (1995) as Michael Kryder
My Neighbor's Daughter (1998) as Dennis Cromwell
Mercenary II: Thick & Thin (1997) as Camera Man
NYPD Blue (2004) as David Lewis

Producer
Picture This: The Times of Peter Bogdanovich in Archer City, Texas (1991)

References

External links
 
 
 AP Obituary in the Los Angeles Times
Obituary in Arts of War on the Web, January 5, 2009

1955 births
2008 deaths
American male television actors
American male film actors
Deaths from brain cancer in the United States
Male actors from Santa Barbara, California
20th-century American male actors